Md. Nobi Newaz is a Bangladesh Awami League politician and the incumbent Member of Parliament from Jhenaidah-3.

Early life
Newaz was born on 9 February 1966. He completed his education up to HSC or grade 12.

Career
Newaz was elected to Parliament on 5 January 2014 from Jhenaidah-3 as a Bangladesh Awami League candidate. He is a Member of the Parliamentary Standing Committee on Environment and Forests Ministry.

References

Awami League politicians
Living people
1966 births
10th Jatiya Sangsad members